Malik Aftab can refer to:

 Malik Aftab (cricketer, born 1982), a Pakistani cricketer
 Malik Aftab (cricketer, born 1996), a Pakistani cricketer